Ready Money is a 1914 American comedy silent film directed by Oscar Apfel adapted by James Montgomery from his play of the same name. The film stars Edward Abeles, Monroe Salisbury, Jode Mullally, Jane Darwell, Bessie Barriscale and Florence Dagmar. The film was released on November 5, 1914, by Paramount Pictures.

Plot

Cast 
Edward Abeles as Steve Baird
Monroe Salisbury as Sidney Rosenthal
Jode Mullally as John H. Tyler
Jane Darwell as Mrs. Tyler
Bessie Barriscale as Grace Tyler
Florence Dagmar as Ida Tyler
James Neill as Jackson Ives
Theodore Roberts as Mike Reardon
William Elmer as Jim Dolan
Sydney Deane as Owner of the Skyrocket
Dick La Reno as Captain West
Fred Montague as James R. Morgan

Preservation
This film is listed as being preserved in the Library of Congress collection.

References

External links 
 
 
 The AFI Catalog of Feature Films:..Ready Money(Wayback)

1914 films
1910s English-language films
Silent American comedy films
1914 comedy films
Paramount Pictures films
American black-and-white films
American silent feature films
Films directed by Oscar Apfel
1910s American films